This article lists the main target shooting events and their results for 2016.

World Events

Olympic & Paralympic Games
The 2016 Olympic Games & 2016 Paralympic Games were held in Rio de Janeiro.
 Shooting at the 2016 Summer Olympics – Qualification
 Shooting at the 2016 Summer Olympics
 Shooting at the 2016 Summer Paralympics – Qualification
 Shooting at the 2016 Summer Paralympics

International Shooting Sport Federation
 July 14–23: 2016 World Running Target Championships held in Suhl, Germany

ISSF World Cup
 2016 ISSF World Cup
 2016 ISSF Junior World Cup

FITASC
2016 Results

Regional Events

Africa

Americas

Asia

2016 Asian Olympic Shooting Qualifying Tournament
 January 27 - February 3: 2016 Asian Olympic Shooting Qualifying Tournament held in New Delhi, India. The tournament was arranged to distribute Olympic Quota places for the Summer Olympics in Rio de Janeiro after the 2015 Asian Shooting Championships were stripped of their quota-awarding status following the IOC suspension of the Kuwait National Olympic Committee.

Asian Shooting Championships
 December 3–9: 2016 Asian Airgun Championships held at the Azadi Sport Complex in Tehran, Iran
 November 1–9: 2016 Asian Shotgun Championships in Abu Dhabi, United Arab Emirates

South Asian Games
 February 10-15: Shooting at the 2016 South Asian Games in Guwahati, India

Europe

European Shooting Confederation
 February 22–28: 2016 European 10 m Events Championships held at the Audi Aréna in Győr, Hungary
 June 12–19: 2016 European Junior Shooting Championships held at the Männiku Shooting Range in Tallinn, Estonia
 July 4–12: 2016 European Shotgun Championships in Lonato del Garda, Italy

"B Matches"
 February 4–6: InterShoot in Den Haag, Netherlands
 December 14–17: RIAC held in Strassen, Luxembourg

National Events

United Kingdom

NRA Imperial Meeting
 July, held at the National Shooting Centre, Bisley
 Queen's Prize winner: 
 Grand Aggregate winner: J Corbett
 Ashburton Shield winners: Wellington College
 Kolapore Winners: 
 National Trophy Winners: 
 Elcho Shield winners: 
 Vizianagram winners: Tied

NSRA National Meeting
 August, held at the National Shooting Centre, Bisley
 Earl Roberts British Prone Champion:

USA
 2016 NCAA Rifle Championships, won by West Virginia Mountaineers

References

 
2016 in sports
2016 sport-related lists